Kiewry  is a settlement in the administrative district of Gmina Świątki, within Olsztyn County, Warmian-Masurian Voivodeship, in northern Poland.

The settlement has a population of 3.

References

Kiewry